Veiholmen is a fishing village located on a group of tiny islands in the northern part of Smøla Municipality in Møre og Romsdal county, Norway. The road goes over many islands connecting Veiholmen to the island of Smøla to the south. In 2015, the village had the population of 212.

For some time, Veiholmen was one of Norway's largest fishing villages (located south of Lofoten), but it has declined significantly throughout the 20th century.  Today, Veiholmen is a very popular place for tourists in the spring, summer, and autumn. The population grows from around 200 people in the winter to more than 2000 people during the peak summer season. The island has several tourist attractions as the Haugjegla Lighthouse, the old fishing village itself, several museums and very good fishing opportunities.

References

Islands of Møre og Romsdal
Villages in Møre og Romsdal
Smøla